Héritier Luvumbu (born 23 July 1992
) is a Congolese professional footballer who plays as a midfielder for Rayon Sports in the Rwanda Premier League.

International career

International goals
Scores and results list DR Congo's goal tally first.

Honours 
AS Vita Club
 Linafoot runner-up: 2013
 CAF Champions League runner-up: 2014

References

External links 
 

1994 births
Living people
Footballers from Kinshasa
Democratic Republic of the Congo footballers
Democratic Republic of the Congo expatriate footballers
Democratic Republic of the Congo international footballers
Association football midfielders
AS Vita Club players
Royale Union Saint-Gilloise players
AS FAR (football) players
Challenger Pro League players
Botola players
Democratic Republic of the Congo expatriate sportspeople in Belgium
Democratic Republic of the Congo expatriate sportspeople in Morocco
Expatriate footballers in Belgium
Expatriate footballers in Morocco
21st-century Democratic Republic of the Congo people
2016 African Nations Championship players
Democratic Republic of the Congo A' international footballers